The Davies Creek Falls is a cascade waterfall on the Davies Creek in the Far North region of Queensland, Australia.

Location and features

See also

 List of waterfalls of Queensland

References

External links

  

Waterfalls of Far North Queensland
Cascade waterfalls